Microsoft Windows is an operating system developed by Microsoft.

Windows may also refer to:
The plural of window, an opening in an opaque surface through which light can pass

Computing 
 Window (computing), a visual display area in a graphical user interface (GUI)
 Windows key, a key on some computer keyboards

Arts and entertainment

Film and television 
 Windows (film), a 1980 erotic thriller
 Windows (TV series), a 1955 American anthology series

Music 
 Windows (country-psych band), a Los Angeles band founded in 2018
 Windows (jazz band), a smooth jazz band (1984–1996)
 "Windows" ucomposition), a 1966 jazz standard by Chick Corea
 "Windows", a 1982 song on Vinyl Confessions by Kansas
 Windows (Jon Lord album), 1974
 Windows (Lee Konitz and Hal Galper album), 1975
 Windows (O'Donel Levy album), 1976
 Windows (Charlie Daniels album), 1982
 Windows (Amanda Somerville album), 2008

See also 
 X Window System (often mis-named "X Windows"), a graphical user interface for many operating systems, especially Unix and Linux variants
 OpenWindows, an implementation used in Solaris from 1989 to 2002
 DECwindows, an implementation for VMS/OpenVMS
 Window (disambiguation)
 Windowing (disambiguation)
 Win-OS/2